Persatuan Sepakbola Kediri Kabupaten, simply known as Persedikab (en: Football Association of Kediri Regency) is an  Indonesian football club based in Kediri Regency, East Java. They play in Liga 3.

Their home ground is Canda Bhirawa Stadium. They are funded by the Government of Kediri Regency. Formed from the fragments of the board Persik Kediri, this team was more used to be known by the public sphere in Indonesia compared with Persik.

This team has twice competed in the Premier Division, the highest tier in Indonesian league at that time, in 1999 and 2003. However, later on, they were even relegated to Second Division, the lowest tier, in 2007. The supporter community is called Fire Ant Colony (F.A.C.).

Players

Current squad

Honours
 Liga 3 East Java
 Runner-up: 2021

Sponsorship
The complete sponsors are as follow

Sponsors
 Johan Astra Pare
 Achilles
 Indomie
 Go-Jek
 Inc
 Torabika Duo

Kit suppliers

References

External links
Persedikab Kediri at Liga-Indonesia.co.id
 

Kediri Regency
Sport in East Java
Football clubs in Indonesia
Football clubs in East Java
1989 establishments in Indonesia
Association football clubs established in 1989